HMS Sandringham after Sandringham, Norfolk is the name of two Royal Navy ships:

 taken over by the Admiralty in August 1939 and returned to her owner in 1946. 
, a minesweeper of the Ham class

Royal Navy ship names